Birch Creek Airport  is a state-owned, public-use airport located one nautical mile (1.85 km) north-northwest of the central business district of Birch Creek, in the Yukon-Koyukuk Census Area in the U.S. state of Alaska.

Facilities and aircraft 
It has one runway designated 16/34 with a gravel surface measuring 4,000 by 75 feet (1,219 x 23 m). For the 12-month period ending December 31, 2005, the airport had 850 aircraft operations, an average of 70 per month: 59% air taxi and 41% general aviation.

Airlines and destinations 

The following airlines offer scheduled passenger service at this airport:

Statistics

References

External links 

Airports in the Yukon–Koyukuk Census Area, Alaska